Systena frontalis, the red-headed flea beetle, is a species of flea beetle in the family Chrysomelidae. It is found in North America. It is named for its red colored head that contrasts its black body. Like other flea beetles, it has powerful saltatorial hind legs specialized for jumping.  Like all beetles, this insect is holometabolous The larvae are off white in color, 5-10mm in length, have a sclerotized head capsule and a short posterior protrusion. 

It is a common insect pest in the eastern United States. Although its origin is uncertain, S. frontalis is thought to be a native species. It has become a highly destructive pest of ornamentals in nurseries. In these nurseries, there is often a zero tolerance for damage it inflicts. Consumers are unlikely to purchase plants that have even slight damage.

It creates "extensive perforations" in the leaves while feeding on common ironweed, Vernonia fasciculata. It is also known to enjoy hydrangeas. Currently, researchers are looking to better understand its phenology and biology to come up with more sustainable pest management practices as opposed to the frequent spraying of pesticides.

Lifecycle
Systena frontalis produces one generation a year under natural conditions, but when infesting the container production of plants it may have up to four generations per year, each generation includes egg, larva, pupa, and adult, it overwinters as eggs.

Host plants
Some of the nursey plants that is feeds on include: cranberry, Hydrangea paniculata, Itlex glabra, Rosa, Rhododenron, Osmanthus fragrans, Salvia, Cornus., Sedum, Viburnum, Loropetalum chinense, Forsythia, Lagerstroemia, Buddleija, Abelia, Gardenia, Guara, Illicium, Pyracantha, and Myrica cerifera.

Gallery

References

Alticini
Beetles described in 1801
Articles created by Qbugbot